Radyo 5 is a Turkish national radio station playing CHR (Contemporary Hit Radio) music. On March 1, 2011, it changed its name to Kral Pop Radyo. With the tender held on April 26, 2010, it was purchased by Cem Aydın, the General Manager of Doğuş Publishing Group, with an offer of $5.2 million.

Radyo 5 DJ list 
 Erdal Şahin
 Ahmetcan Serin
 Merih Guzelarda

Slogans 
 We lead They Follow!
 It's Fresh 
 The Big radio
 Today's Hit Music

References

External links 
 Official site
 Radyo 5 94.7

Radio stations in Turkey
Mass media in Istanbul
Radio stations established in 1997
Küçükçekmece